Chromium trioxide (also known as chromium(VI) oxide or chromic anhydride) is an inorganic compound with the formula CrO3.  It is the acidic anhydride of chromic acid, and is sometimes marketed under the same name.
This compound is a dark-purple solid under anhydrous conditions, bright orange when wet and which dissolves in water concomitant with hydrolysis.  Millions of kilograms are produced annually, mainly for electroplating. Chromium trioxide is a powerful oxidiser and a carcinogen.

Production, structure, and basic reactions
Chromium trioxide is generated by treating sodium dichromate with sulfuric acid:
H2SO4 + Na2Cr2O7 → 2 CrO3 + Na2SO4 + H2O

Approximately 100,000 tonnes are produced annually by this or similar routes.

The solid consists of chains of tetrahedrally coordinated chromium atoms that share vertices. Each chromium center therefore shares two oxygen centers with neighbors. Two oxygen atoms are not shared, giving an overall stoichiometry of 1:3.

The structure of monomeric CrO3 has been calculated using density functional theory, and is predicted to be pyramidal (point group C3v) rather than planar (point group D3h).

Chromium trioxide decomposes above 197 °C, liberating oxygen and eventually giving Cr2O3:
4 CrO3 → 2 Cr2O3 + 3 O2

It is used in organic synthesis as an oxidant, often as a solution in acetic acid, or acetone in the case of the Jones oxidation.  In these oxidations, the Cr(VI) converts primary alcohols to the corresponding carboxylic acids and secondary alcohols to ketones. The reactions are shown below:

 Primary alcohols to carboxylic acids
4 CrO3 + 3 RCH2OH + 12 H+ → 3 RCOOH + 4 Cr3+ + 9 H2O
 Secondary alcohols to ketones
2 CrO3 + 3 R2CHOH + 6 H+ → 3 R2C=O + 2 Cr3+ + 6 H2O

Applications
Chromium trioxide is mainly used in chrome plating.  It is typically employed with additives that affect the plating process but do not react with the trioxide.  The trioxide reacts with cadmium, zinc, and other metals to generate passivating chromate films that resist corrosion.  It is also used in the production of synthetic rubies. Chromic acid solution is also used in applying types of anodic coating to aluminium, which are primarily used in aerospace applications. On the International Space Station, it is used to control bacteria growth in the wastewater storage tank. A chromic acid/phosphoric acid solution is also the preferred stripping agent of anodic coatings of all types.

Safety
Chromium trioxide is highly toxic, corrosive, and carcinogenic. It is the main example of hexavalent chromium, an environmental hazard. The related chromium(III) derivatives are not particularly dangerous; thus, reductants are used to destroy chromium(VI) samples.

Chromium trioxide, being a powerful oxidizer, will ignite organic materials such as alcohols on contact.

Images

References

External links

 ATSDR Case Studies in Environmental Medicine: Chromium Toxicity U.S. Department of Health and Human Services
 Chromium Trioxide at The Periodic Table of Videos (University of Nottingham)
 Reactions with Chromium Trioxide as Oxidizing Agent

Acidic oxides
Chromium(VI) compounds